Kremlin is a town in Garfield County, Oklahoma, United States. The population was 255 at the 2010 census, a 6.25 percent increase from the figure of 240 in 2000.

History
The community now known as Kremlin was once called Wild Horse. The Chisholm Trail passed within a quarter mile of the community. The Chicago, Rock Island and Pacific Railroad built a line through the area in 1889. The opening of the Cherokee Outlet for settlement in 1889, led to a flood of settlers. Among them were a group of farmers of German descent from Russia. They brought seeds of winter-hardy Russian wheat that became the major farm crop in this area. The town was renamed in their honor.

Geography
Kremlin is located at  (36.547642, -97.832236).

Climate

Demographics

As of the census of 2000, there were 240 people, 98 households, and 72 families residing in the town. There were 112 housing units at an average density of 443.3 per square mile (173.0/km2). The racial makeup of the town was 95.00% White, 1.67% African American, 0.42% Native American, 0.42% Pacific Islander, and 2.50% from two or more races. Hispanic or Latino of any race were 0.42% of the population.

There were 98 households, out of which 28.6% had children under the age of 18 living with them, 62.2% were married couples living together, 7.1% had a female householder with no husband present, and 26.5% were non-families. 25.5% of all households were made up of individuals, and 11.2% had someone living alone who was 65 years of age or older. The average household size was 2.45 and the average family size was 2.96.

In the town, the population was spread out, with 25.0% under the age of 18, 8.8% from 18 to 24, 22.1% from 25 to 44, 28.3% from 45 to 64, and 15.8% who were 65 years of age or older. The median age was 41 years. For every 100 females, there were 108.7 males. For every 100 females age 18 and over, there were 102.2 males.

The median income for a household in the town was $35,417, and the median income for a family was $38,438. Males had a median income of $31,458 versus $22,000 for females. The per capita income for the town was $14,156. About 3.7% of families and 4.2% of the population were below the poverty line, including 5.8% of those under the age of eighteen and 5.1% of those sixty-five or over.

Education
Its school district is Kremlin-Hillsdale Schools.

References

Towns in Garfield County, Oklahoma
Towns in Oklahoma